When Angels Come to Town  is a 2004 American made-for-television fantasy drama film directed by Andy Wolk and starring Tammy Blanchard, Peter Falk, and Katey Sagal. It first aired on CBS. The film is a second sequel to the 2001 television film A Town Without Christmas.

Plot
The angel Max (Peter Falk) is sent to Maine to help out a family during the Christmas season. Max goes to a Christmas store and leaves behind a box. The attending counter girl, Sally (Tammy Blanchard) goes after him but Max has disappeared. Sally is a kindhearted young woman who is trying to gain custody of her younger brother Jimmy (Alexander Conti) so he doesn't go into the foster system. Because Max has diverted from his mission of delivering the box to its rightful owner by inadvertently helping the wrong family, his supervisor Jo (Katey Sagal) arrives to chastise him and guide him to the Hoffman family where father and son are almost estranged due to their disagreement in how to run their family owned Christmas ornament business.

Cast
 Peter Falk as Max, a whimsical, kind angel sent to help the Hoffman family
 Tammy Blanchard as Sally Reid
 Seann Gallagher as Karl Hoffman, a young businessman who has recently taken over the family-run Christmas ornament business and is modernising the business much to the dismay of his old school German father
 Katey Sagal as Jo, an angel sent to supervise Max
 Alexander Conti as Jimmy Reid, Sally's kid brother
 Vlasta Vrána as Franz Hoffman, Karl's father who wants his son to appreciate their traditions
 Kathleen Fee as Marion, an employee at the Hoffmans' ornament factory
 Wyatt Bowen as Charlie
 Babs Chula as Lois Vernon, a social worker who is handling Jimmy's case
 Marc Anthony Krupa as Uncle Gregory

See also 
 List of Christmas films
 List of films about angels

References

External links
 
 

2004 television films
2004 films
American Christmas drama films
2000s Christmas drama films
2000s fantasy drama films
Television sequel films
CBS network films
Films directed by Andy Wolk
Films scored by Patrick Williams
Christmas television films
2000s English-language films
2000s American films